Taurotettix is a genus of leafhoppers in the tribe Cicadulini. The genus is widely distributed across Eurasia with one species (T. beckeri) found in Algeria.

Species 
There are currently 4 described species in Taurotettix:

 Taurotettix beckeri 
 Taurotettix elegans 
 Taurotettix modestus 
 Taurotettix subornatus

References

External links 

 
 Taurotettix at insectoid.info

Cicadellidae genera
Athysanini